Kapıkaya Canyon is a canyon located in Adana Province, southern Turkey.

Geography
The canyon is the valley of the Çakıt Creek one of the main tributaries of Seyhan River. The northern end is the Çakıt dam reservoir.

Touristic attraction
In the northern end the municipality of Karaisalı has established a picnic area known as Yerköprü .In the southern end, a 2000-meter walking track has been constructed at the east bank of the creek using the funds of the Çukurova Development Agency.

References

Tourist attractions in Adana Province
Karaisalı
Canyons and gorges of Turkey
Landforms of Adana Province